Jihne Mera Dil Luteya is a 2011 Indian Punjabi language romantic comedy film directed by Mandeep Kumar with story and screenplay by Dheeraj Rattan, produced by Batra Showbiz Pvt. Ltd. and starring Gippy Grewal, Diljit Dosanjh, Neeru Bajwa, Binnu Dhillon.

Reception
Jihne Mera Dil Luteya saw the biggest opening day, weekend and week ever for a Punjabi movie at the time of release. It had an opening week of Rs 26.5 million in Punjab.

Plot
Life is carefree and filled with series of mischievous events for dashing and happy-go-lucky Yuvraj and the handsome rocking rebel Gurnoor at Punjabi University, Patiala. Both are neighbours whose families do not get along with one another. They are then are bedazzled by the charming and sexy Noor, whose dad is very wealthy, and has recently returned from abroad. Both Yuvraj and Gurnoor's dads tell the boys to make her fall in love with them. After a while Noor's dad goes bankrupt. Both Yuvraj and Gurnoor's dads tell them not to go after her and focus on their education. But both have fallen for Noor who has swept them off their feet the moment she landed in their lives. The comedy unfolds and Noor tells Gurnoor she loves Yuvraj. Yuvraj then marries Noor with the help of Gurnoor.

Cast
 Gippy Grewal as Yuvvraaj Randhawa
 Diljit Dosanjh as Gurnoor Randhawa
 Neeru Bajwa as Noor Bajwa
 Binnu Dhillon as Karanveer
 B.N. Sharma as P.K. Palta
 Karamjit Anmol as Karma
 Jaswinder Bhalla as Professor Bhalla
 Rana Jung Bahadur as Advocate Shingara 
 Tej Sapru as Gurnoor’s Father
 Sardar Sohi as Yuvvraaj‘s Father 
 Sunita Dhir as Mrs. Randhawa
 Shivender Mahal as Mr. Bajwa

PTC Punjabi Film Awards 2012

Jihne Mera Dil Luteya won eight awards at the 2nd PTC Punjabi Film Awards in 2012.

Soundtrack

Track list

References
4. Song Jinne mera dil luteya is recently recreated in Movie Jawaani jaaneman releasing January 2020. Gallan Kardi Song Lyrics from Jawaani Jaaneman released today.

2011 films
Punjabi-language Indian films
2010s Punjabi-language films
Films scored by Jatinder Shah
Films scored by Yo Yo Honey Singh